Cisthene polyzona is a moth of the family Erebidae. It was described by Herbert Druce in 1885. It is found in Mexico, Dominica and Rio de Janeiro, Brazil.

References

Cisthenina
Moths described in 1885